Mukta is a 1994 Marathi film directed by Jabbar Patel. The film stars Shreeram Lagoo, Sonali Kulkarni, Reema Lagoo and Vikram Gokhale in lead roles. Mukta won the 1994 National Award for Best Feature Film on National Integration. It is considered one of the important Marathi films for the period 1993–98.

Plot
Daughter of a Marathi poet settled in United States, Mukta returns to her ancestral home when she gets a post-graduate scholarship to study sociology. She lives with her grandfather, Abasaheb Kanase-Patil, a veteran of Maharashtra's co-operative movement. At the university she joins a street theatre group of Dalit activists and is drawn to the group's leader Milind Wagh, a fearless student leader and poet. Family's unease increases when her friend from America Julian arrives. Julian, however, wins over her grandfather accompanying him to a pilgrimage to Pandharpur. The old man recalling Marathi Saint poets’ struggle against caste inequalities is complemented by Julian singing of songs associated with the struggle against the racial discrimination in US.

Cast
The cast is as follows:
 Sonali Kulkarni as Mukta
 Shriram Lagoo as her grandfather
 Vikram Gokhale as  Eknath, Mukta father
 Vandana Pandit-Sheth as Mukta  Mother
 Avinash Narkar as Milind Wagh, Social Activist
 Reema Lagoo as Rukmini
 Caleb Obura Obwatinykaas Mukta's African-American friend Julian
 Madhu Kambikar as Chandrabhaga
 Prashant Subedar as Prithviraj
 Chandrakant Kale as Paranjape
Upendra Limaye as Social Activist Group Member under Milind Wagh

Music
"Valan Vatatl Ya" - Ravinda Sathe
"Jaai Juicha Gandh Matila" - Jayshree Shivram
"Raktaat" (Poetry) - Avinash Narkar
"Eliza Eliza" - Clinton Cerejo Serejo
"Vidyasangeet" (part 1) - Anand Modak
"Too Talam" - Prabhanjan Marathe
"Vidyasangeet" (part 2) - Anand Modak
"Panyas" (Poetry) - Sonali Kulkarni
"I Came" - Clinton Cerejo Serejo
"Tya Maziya" - Ravinda Sathe

References

External links

1994 films
1990s Marathi-language films
Best Film on National Integration National Film Award winners
Films directed by Jabbar Patel
Films scored by Anand Modak